"Dahlia" is the thirteenth single by Japanese heavy metal band X Japan, released on February 26, 1996.

Summary 
"Dahlia" went on to become the title track of the band's 1996 album and one of Yoshiki's last compositions in his signature blend of speed and symphonic metal. The song's title, "Dahlia", appears in the lyrics as an acronym during a voice over, which says "destiny, alive, heaven, love, innocence, always, destroy, aftermath, hell, life, infinite".

The single was released with two different covers. The B-side is a live version of "Tears", recorded on December 30, 1993, at the Tokyo Dome. The same recording also appears on their live compilation album Live Live Live Tokyo Dome 1993-1996.

Commercial performance 
The single reached number 1 on the Oricon charts, and charted for 8 weeks. In 1996, with 412,810 copies sold was the 72nd best-selling single of the year, being certified Platinum by RIAJ.

Track listing

Personnel 
Co-Producer – X Japan
Orchestra arranged by – Yoshiki, Dick Marx, Shelly Berg
Scored by – Tom Halm
Orchestra – American Symphony Orchestra
Mixed by – Yuji Sugiyama
Assistant engineers – Tal Miller, Brad Haehnel, Takaoki Saitoh, Cappy Japngie
Recorded by – Rich Breen, Mike Ging
Mastered by – Stephen Marcussen (Precision Studio)

References 

1996 singles
Oricon Weekly number-one singles
X Japan songs
Songs written by Yoshiki (musician)
Atlantic Records singles
Torch songs
1993 songs